Zhong Denghua (born November 1963) is a Chinese Hydraulic engineer and the current vice minister of Ministry of Education of the People's Republic of China. He is an alternate member of the 19th Central Committee of the Chinese Communist Party.

Biography
Zhong graduated from Jiangxi University of Technology (now Nanchang University) in 1985, majored in water conservancy and hydropower engineering.  He was elected a member of the Chinese Academy of Engineering in 2009. In 2012, he was appointed as the executive vice president of Tianjin University. In 2016, he was appointed as the president of Tianjin University. In 2019, he was appointed as the vice minister of Ministry of Education of the People's Republic of China.

References

1963 births
Living people
Members of the Chinese Academy of Engineering
Presidents of Tianjin University
Alternate members of the 19th Central Committee of the Chinese Communist Party
Engineers from Jiangxi
Politicians from Ganzhou
People's Republic of China politicians from Jiangxi
Chinese Communist Party politicians from Jiangxi
Academic staff of Tianjin University
Educators from Jiangxi
Nanchang University alumni